Palazzolo may refer to:

Places in Italy
Palazzolo (Rome), a hill in Rome
Palazzolo sull'Oglio, a comune in the Province of Brescia
Palazzolo Acreide, a comune in the Province of Siracusa
Palazzolo Vercellese, a comune in the Province of Vercelli
Palazzolo dello Stella, a comune in the Province of Udine
Palazzolo, a frazione of Sona in the Province of Verona
Palazzolo, a frazione of Fossato di Vico in the Province of Perugia
Palazzolo, a frazione of Incisa in Val d'Arno in the Province of Florence
Palazzolo, a quarter of Paderno Dugnano in the Province of Milan

Other uses
Palazzolo (surname), a surname (and a list of people with the name)

See also
Palazzolo v. Rhode Island a 2001 U.S. Supreme Court precedent